The British Commonwealth Air Training Plan (BCATP), or Empire Air Training Scheme (EATS) often referred to as simply "The Plan", was a massive, joint military aircrew training program created by the United Kingdom, Canada, Australia and New Zealand, during the Second World War. BCATP remains one of the single largest aviation training programs in history and was responsible for training nearly half the pilots, navigators, bomb aimers, air gunners, wireless operators and flight engineers who served with the Royal Air Force (RAF), Royal Navy Fleet Air Arm (FAA), Royal Australian Air Force (RAAF), Royal Canadian Air Force (RCAF) and Royal New Zealand Air Force (RNZAF) during the war.

Under a parallel agreement, the Joint Air Training Scheme, South Africa trained 33,347 aircrew for the South African Air Force and other Allied air forces. This number was exceeded only by Canada, which trained 131,500 personnel.

Students from many other countries attended schools under these plans, including Argentina, Belgium, Ceylon, Czechoslovakia, Denmark, Finland, Fiji, Free France, Greece, the Netherlands, Newfoundland, Norway, Poland, and the United States, where the similar Civilian Pilot Training Program was already underway by the end of 1938.

Background
The United Kingdom was considered an unsuitable location for air training, due to the possibility of enemy attack, the strain caused by wartime traffic at airfields and the unpredictable weather, so the plan called for the facilities in the Dominions to train British and each other's aircrews.

Negotiations regarding joint training, between the four governments concerned, took place in Ottawa during the first few months of the war. On 17 December 1939, they signed the Air Training Agreement – often referred to as the "Riverdale Agreement", after the UK representative at the negotiations, Lord Riverdale.

The British Commonwealth Air Training Plan was viewed as an incredibly ambitious programme. The 1939 agreement stated that the training was to be similar to that of the RAF: three initial training schools, thirteen elementary flying training schools, sixteen service flying training schools, ten air observer schools, ten bombing and gunnery schools, two air navigation schools and four wireless schools were to be created.

The agreement called for the training of nearly 50,000 aircrew each year, for as long as necessary: 22,000 aircrew from Great Britain, 13,000 from Canada, 11,000 from Australia and 3,300 from New Zealand. Under the agreement, air crews received elementary training in various Commonwealth countries before travelling to Canada for advanced courses. Training costs were to be divided between the four governments.

Article XV of the agreement stipulated that graduates belonging to Dominion air forces, where they were assigned to service with the RAF, should be placed in new squadrons identified with the RAAF, RCAF and RNZAF. These units later became known as "Article XV squadrons". Articles XVI and XVII stipulated that the UK government would be wholly responsible for the pay and entitlements of graduates, once they were placed with RAF or Article XV units. Some pre-war/regular RAAF and RCAF squadrons also served under RAF operational control, while New Zealand and Rhodesian personnel were frequently assigned to RAF squadrons with the honorifics of "(NEW ZEALAND)" and "(RHODESIA)" in their names. However, in practice – and technically in contravention of Article XV – most personnel from other Commonwealth countries, while they were under RAF operational control, were assigned to British units.

On 29 April 1940, the first Canadian training course officially commenced, with 221 recruits, at No. 1 Initial Training School RCAF, located initially at the Eglinton Hunt Club, Toronto. From this intake, 39 received their wings as aircrew on 30 September 1940. All of these graduates, however, were retained by the BCATP in Canada, as instructors, staff pilots or in similar flying assignments. The first BCATP personnel sent to the UK were 37 Canadian observers, who received their wings at RCAF Trenton, near Trenton, Ontario, on 27 October 1940. The first BCATP-trained pilots posted to Europe as a group were 37 RAAF personnel who graduated in November 1941, from No. 2 Service Flying Training School, RCAF Uplands, Ottawa.

Countries and colonies involved

Australia

Prior to the inception of the Empire Air Training Scheme (as it was commonly known in Australia), the RAAF trained only about 50 pilots per year. Under the Air Training Agreement, Australia undertook to provide 28,000 aircrew over three years, representing 36% of the total number trained by the BCATP.  By 1945, more than 37,500 Australian aircrew had been trained in Australia; a majority of these, over 27,300, had also graduated from schools in Australia.

During 1940, Royal Australian Air Force (RAAF) schools were established across Australia to support EATS in Initial Training, Elementary Flying Training, Service Flying Training, Air Navigation, Air Observer, Bombing and Gunnery and Wireless Air Gunnery. The first flying course started on 29 April 1940. Keith Chisholm (who later became an ace and served with No. 452 Squadron RAAF over Europe and the Pacific) was the first Australian to be trained under EATS.

For a period, most RAAF aircrews received advanced training in Canada. During mid-1940, however, some RAAF trainees began to receive advanced training at RAF facilities in Southern Rhodesia.

On 14 November 1940, the first contingent to graduate from advanced training in Canada embarked for Britain,

Following the outbreak of the Pacific War in December 1941, the majority of RAAF aircrews completed their training in Australia and served with RAAF units in the South West Pacific Theatre. In addition, an increasing number of Australian personnel were transferred from Europe and the Mediterranean to RAF squadrons in the South East Asian Theatre. Some Article XV squadrons were also transferred to RAAF or RAF formations involved in the Pacific War. Nevertheless, a significant proportion of RAAF personnel remained in Europe and RAAF Article XV squadrons continued to be formed there.

By early 1944, the flow of RAAF replacement personnel to Europe had begun to outstrip demand, and, following a request by the British government, was wound back significantly. Australian involvement was effectively terminated in October 1944.

Bermuda (British Colony)

A relatively large number (given the tiny size and population) of islanders from the British colony of Bermuda (now termed a British Overseas Territory, and as such neither then part of the old Commonwealth of Dominions nor today a member of the Commonwealth of Nations, other than through Britain's membership) served as air and ground crew in the Royal Flying Corps and the Royal Air Force during the First World War. Despite the importance of the Royal Naval Dockyard and the use of the colony (located 640 miles off North Carolina) in both World Wars as a forming-up point for trans-Atlantic convoys, attempts to raise a Royal Air Force Reserve in the colony from RAF veterans between the wars did not meet with success.

The purpose of the Bermuda Flying School was to train local pilots for the Air Ministry, which would assign them to the RAF or the Fleet Air Arm. The school was in operation by the summer of 1940. It operated a pair of Luscombe sea planes, paid for by an American resident of Bermuda, Mr Bertram Work, and a Canadian, Mr Duncan MacMartin. Its location in the heart of an RAF Air Station used by RAF Transport Command and Ferry Command afforded considerable opportunity to gain experience on the Consolidated Catalina and other flying boats at the station. Staff and trainees were also frequently used by nearby Royal Naval Air Station on Boaz Island to fly Supermarine Walrus anti-submarine air patrols. The school was placed under the command of Major Cecil Montgomery-Moore, DFC, the Commanding Officer of the Bermuda Volunteer Engineers (BVE), who had transferred from the Bermuda Volunteer Rifle Corps (BVRC) to become a Royal Flying Corps fighter pilot during the First World War. The chief flying instructor was an American, Captain Ed Stafford.

The first class, of eighteen students, was in training by May 1940. The BFS only accepted applicants who were already serving in one of the part-time army units of the Bermuda Garrison (only whites were accepted, barring most of the potential applicants from the Bermuda Militia Artillery and the Bermuda Militia Infantry, which recruited from the coloured population, although a number of coloured Bermudians from these units were to become aircrew after the RAF's bar on coloured recruitment was lifted in 1943), which had been mobilised for the duration of the war to protect the Royal Naval Dockyard and other sites important to the war effort. Successful students were released from their units and allowed to proceed overseas, usually as members of the crews delivering flying boats from Bermuda to Greenock, Scotland.

Although the school was originally run as a purely local effort, under the colonial Government of Bermuda, it was quickly incorporated into the Commonwealth Air Training Plan. While most of the pilots it trained continued to come from the local population, eight citizens of the United States of America who volunteered to serve with the Royal Air Force were sent to Bermuda to train at the Bermuda Flying School. These Americans were required to enlist into the Bermuda Volunteer Rifle Corps, from which they were discharged upon the successful completion of their flight training.

By 1942, the Air Ministry had a glut of trained pilots, resulting from the fear created by the Blitz and the Battle of Britain. Desperate for pilots, too many had been allowed to train, or had been placed on backlists to await slots for induction and training. This would continue to be a problem as late as 1944, when the British Army was forced to disband a division after Operation Overlord due to a shortage of manpower. At the same time, the Air Ministry had the equivalent of a division of civilians waiting aircrew training slots, and already had more aircrew than it had aircraft available for them to man. This would lead to pilots being transferred to the Army's Glider Pilot Regiment, and to the lists of civilians reserved for aircrew training being cleared of men who were then able to be conscripted by the Army.

In Bermuda, the excess of pilots meant that the BFS was advised in 1942 that no further pilots were required. By then, eighty pilots had been sent to the RAF and Fleet Air Arm. Although the school was closed, Bertram Work and Major Montgomery-Moore oversaw the conversion of its administration into a recruiting arm, the Bermuda Flying Committee, for the Royal Canadian Air Force (RCAF), sending sixty aircrew candidates to that service before the War's end. Sixteen Bermudian women were also sent to the RCAF to perform roles including Air Traffic Controller.

Canada

Canada was chosen as the primary location for "The Plan" because of its ideal weather; wide open spaces suitable for flight and navigation training, sometimes on a large scale; ample supplies of fuel; industrial facilities for the production of trainer aircraft, parts and supplies; the lack of any threat from either the Luftwaffe or Japanese fighter aircraft; and its relative proximity to both the European and Pacific theatres. For initial training biplanes, as one example of the wide range of American and British aircraft designs used for Canadian-based training facilities, pilots might have started their initial flight training on both British and Canadian-produced examples of the Tiger Moth, the Boeing Stearman from the nearby United States, or even the indigenously designed and produced Fleet Finch biplane.

The government agreed in December 1939 to join the British Commonwealth Air Training Plan, operate its bases in Canada, and pick up a large proportion of the costs. Events turned the scheme into a huge operation, one that cost Canada $1.6 billion of a total cost of $2.2 billion, and employed 104,000 Canadians in airbases across the land.

The W.L.M. King government saw involvement in the BCATP as a means of keeping Canadians at home, but more importantly, it eased demands for a large expeditionary force and buried the politically divisive issue of overseas conscription. Negotiating the agreement and agreeing upon aspects of involvement was notably difficult. Canada agreed to accept most of the costs of the plan but in return insisted British pronouncement that air training would be Canada's primary war effort. Yet another negotiation point was the British expectation that the RAF would absorb Canadian air training graduates without restrictions, as in World War One, and distribute them across the RAF. W.L.M. King demanded that Canadian airmen be identified as members of the RCAF with distinct uniforms and shoulder badges.

The RCAF would run the plan in Canada, but to satisfy RAF concerns, Robert Leckie, a senior RAF commander (at the time in charge of RAF squadrons in Malta) and a Canadian, was posted to Ottawa as Director of Training. From 1940 he directed BCATP training.

At its height of the British Commonwealth Air Training Plan, 131,533 Allied pilots and aircrew were trained in Canada, 72,835 of which were Canadian. At the plan's high point in late 1943, an organisation of over 100,000 administrative personnel operated 107 schools and 184 other supporting units at 231 locations all across Canada.

Infrastructure development including erecting "some 8,300 buildings of which 700 were hangars or of hangar-type construction." A total of 100 sewage treatment and disposal plants and 120 water pumping stations were completed; and more than 2,000 miles of main power lines and 535 miles of underground electrical cable placed, servicing a total connected electrical power load of over 80,700 horsepower.

In late 1944, the Air Ministry announced the winding-up of the plan, since the Commonwealth air forces had long had a surplus of air crews. At the conclusion of the war, over 167,000 students, including over 50,000 pilots, had trained in Canada under the program from May 1940 to March 1945. While the majority of those who successfully completed the program went on to serve in the RAF, over half (72,835) of the 131,553 graduates were Canadians.

New Zealand
During the war, the RNZAF contributed 2,743 fully trained pilots to serve with the RAF in Europe, the Middle East, and Far East. Another 1,521 pilots who completed their training in New Zealand were retained in country; either as instructors, staff pilots, or manning operational squadrons formed during the latter half of the war. In 1940, before the British Commonwealth Air Training Plan was fully developed, New Zealand also trained 183 observers and 395 air gunners for the RAF. From 1943 onwards, the training of wireless operator/air gunners, and navigators was carried on in New Zealand for Pacific operations. In addition, some 2,910 pilots were trained to elementary standards and sent to Canada to continue their training. More than 2,700 wireless operator/air-gunners, 1,800 navigators, and 500 bombardiers passed through the Initial Training Wing before proceeding to Canada. Of the 131,000 trainees who graduated in Canada under the Commonwealth Air Training Plan, New Zealanders formed 5.3%.

South Africa

Despite the prewar South African Air Force (SAAF) expansion plans, the start of the Second World War in 1939 caught the SAAF unprepared. New flying schools were established at Pretoria, Germiston, Bloemfontein and Baragwanath, while a training command under Lieutenant Colonel W.T.B. Tasker oversaw the SAAF's overall training programme. With the establishment of the Joint Air Training Scheme (JATS) 38 South African–based air schools were employed to train Royal Air Force, SAAF and other allied air and ground crews. Aircraft and other equipment required for the training were provided to South Africa free of charge by the United Kingdom. Under this scheme, the SAAF, by September 1941, increased the total number of military aircraft to 1,709 while the personnel strength had grown to 31,204, including 956 pilots. During its five-year existence, the JATS turned out a total of 33,347 aircrew, including 12,221 SAAF personnel.

Southern Rhodesia

On the outbreak of war in September 1939, the Government of Southern Rhodesia made an offer to the British Air Ministry to run a flying school and train personnel to man three squadrons (44, 237 and 266 (Rhodesia) Squadrons), which was duly accepted. The Rhodesian Air Training Group (RATG), operating 1940–1945, was set up as part of the overall Commonwealth Air Training Plan. In January 1940 the Government announced the creation of a Department of Air, completely separate from that of Defence and appointed Ernest Lucas Guest as Minister of Air. Guest inaugurated and administered what became the second largest Empire Air Training Scheme, beginning with the establishment of three units at Salisbury, Bulawayo and Gwelo, each consisting of a preliminary and an advanced training school.

Rhodesia was the last of the Commonwealth countries to enter the Empire Air Training Scheme and the first to turn out fully qualified pilots. No. 25 Elementary Flying Training School at Belvedere, Salisbury opened on 24 May 1940. By August 1940, the schools could train up to 1800 pilots, 240 observers and 340 gunners per year. The original programme of an initial training wing and six schools was increased to 10 flying training schools and bombing, navigation and gunnery school and a school for the training of flying instructors as well as additional schools for bomb aimers, navigators and air gunners, including stations at Cranbourne (Salisbury), Norton, Gwelo and Heany (near Bulawayo). To relieve congestion at the air stations, six relief landing grounds for landing and takeoff instruction and two air firing and bombing ranges were established. Two aircraft and engine repair and overhaul depots were set up as well as the Central Maintenance Unit to deal with bulk stores for the whole group.

The trainees came mainly from Great Britain but also from Australia, Canada, South Africa, New Zealand, USA, Yugoslavia, Greece, France, Poland, Czechoslovakia, Kenya, Uganda, Tanganyika, Fiji and Malta. There were also pupils from the Royal Hellenic Air Force in training. Over 7,600 pilots and 2,300 navigators were trained by the RATG during the war.

United States
By mid-1940, Canadian flying instructors were primarily employed in the BCATP and to increase the numbers of flying instructors, the RCAF began a campaign to recruit American pilots. Air Marshal W.A. ("Billy") Bishop was instrumental in setting up a clandestine recruiting organisation in the then still-neutral United States – at about the same time that some eighteen American flight schools had signed up for the USA's own CPTP program. Americans began crossing the border, appearing at the nearest recruiting centres. President Roosevelt ordered that Americans going to Canada to join the RCAF or RAF would be granted exemption by the US draft board. By war's end, 16,000 RAF aircrew were trained in the United States. After Pearl Harbor, 1,759 American members of the RCAF transferred to the armed forces of the United States, another 2,000 transferred later on, and about 5,000 completed their service with the RCAF.

Legacy

Canada

The British Commonwealth Air Training Plan illustrated that the Commonwealth still had some military meaning during the Second World War and was one of Canada's major contributions to the early war effort. The BCATP was an impressive and uniting national achievement. Canada became, during the Second World War, one of the great air training centres contributing more than 130,000 trained aircrew to the Allied Cause. The federal government paid three-quarters of the total bill, an amount in excess of two and a quarter billion dollars.

On the third anniversary of the Plan President Roosevelt enthused that the BCATP had transformed Canada into the "aerodrome of democracy", a play on his earlier description of the United States as "the Arsenal of Democracy."

Wrought iron gates were chosen by the UK, New Zealand and Australia to commemorate Canada's contribution to the Plan, and were placed to overlook the parade square at CFB Trenton.

Various aircraft, transport and training artefacts may be seen at the Commonwealth Air Training Plan Museum, located in Brandon, Manitoba.

As Canada was the main participant, the legacy of the plan there included a strong postwar aviation sector and many new or improved airports across the country, the majority of which are still in use. The classic BCATP airport consisted of three runways, each typically 2,500 ft (760 m) in length, arranged in a triangle so that aircraft could always land (more-or-less) into the wind – that was critically important at a time when most light training aircraft (such as the North American Harvard) were taildraggers, which are difficult to land in strong cross-winds.

That triangular runway outline is perfectly preserved at Claresholm Industrial Airport, but is still easily visible under later runway extensions at most Canadian BCATP airports, such as Kingston/Norman Rogers Airport, Boundary Bay Airport and Pendelton, Ontario airport. Later modifications have often resulted in one runway being lengthened to handle larger aircraft such as jets, and in less-used runways being closed or converted to taxiways.

The BCATP provided an economic boost in the Western provinces that were still recovering from the decade long depression.  The final report of the BCATP Supervisory Board calculated that "more than 3,750 members of the RAF, RAAF, RNZAF and Allied nationals under RAF quotas married Canadian girls," many of whom remained in Canada to raise families.

In 1959, Queen Elizabeth II unveiled The Ottawa Memorial, a monument erected to commemorate, "by name, some 800 men and women who lost their lives while serving or training with the Air Forces of the Commonwealth in Canada, the West Indies and the United States and who have no known grave."

The Commonwealth Air Training Plan (CATP) Museum is a non-profit, charitable organisation in Brandon, Manitoba, founded and operated by volunteers. The museum is dedicated to the preservation of the history of the British Commonwealth Air Training Plan and serves as a unique memorial to those airmen who trained and served, and especially those who died, while serving their country in the air war of 1939–1945. This is the only museum in the world dedicated solely to this goal, located in Manitoba where so much of the training was carried out. The collection includes 14 aircraft on display with the museum's Auster, Harvard, Cornell and Stinson HW-75 airworthy.

The Commonwealth Air Training Plan may also be regarded as the precursor of post-war international air training schemes in Canada, many of them involving personnel from other NATO powers. These include the NATO Air Training Plan (1950–1957) that graduated 4,600 pilots and navigators from 10 countries. Later bilateral arrangements with individual NATO powers (1959–1983), the Military Training Assistance Plan, which has trained aircrews from developing countries since 1964 and NATO Flying Training in Canada (NFTC), since 1998, a partnership of the Canadian Forces, Bombardier Aerospace Corporation and participating air forces. In 2005, the Canadian Department of National Defence awarded a 22-year, $1.77-billion contract to an Allied Wings team led by Kelowna Flightcraft Ltd. of Kelowna, British Columbia, to provide flying training and support services to the Canadian Forces and international allies. These services are provided out of the Canada Wings Aviation Training Centre in the Southport Aerospace Centre near Portage la Prairie, Manitoba.

The British Commonwealth Air Training Plan was designated a National Historic Event on 18 November 1983.

South Africa

The South African Air Force Memorial at Swartkop, Tshwane, includes a memorial to the Royal Air Force members who died in South Africa during the Joint Air Training Scheme.

The Port Elizabeth branch of the South African Air Force Museum is still housed in the original 42-Air School Air Gunnery Training Centre used during the Joint Air Training Scheme.

Australia
The "Scheme" cost Australia about £100,000,000 for its commitments. In addition to the Empire Air Training Scheme, wartime demands had led to training for home requirements. The RAAF built air training and ground training schools, airfields and specialised schools that served the country well in wartime as well as postwar. All the service flying training schools were disbanded, except Uranquinty. The Uranquinty Base continued to provide refresher courses for qualified pilots and even briefly became a migrant centre in the late 1940s until it reopened as No 1 Basic Flying Training School between 1951 and 1959 when it finally closed. The Wireless Air Gunners' School at Ballarat remained as the RAAF Radio School until 1961.

A memorial was dedicated to 5 Service Flying Training School RAAF, within the Empire Air Training Scheme at Uranquinty, 19 September 1999.

EATS pilot training schools at Evans Head, New South Wales, Cunderdin, Western Australia, Point Cook, Victoria, Essendon, Victoria and Laverton, Victoria are on state or national heritage lists. Wireless operator/air gunners' schools at Maryborough, Queensland, and Ballarat, Victoria, are currently recommended for state heritage listing.

See also
Article XV squadrons
British Flying Training School Program
Civilian Pilot Training Program of the United States
List of British Commonwealth Air Training Plan facilities in Australia
List of British Commonwealth Air Training Plan facilities in Canada
List of British Commonwealth Air Training Plan facilities in South Africa
List of British Commonwealth Air Training Plan facilities in Southern Rhodesia
:Category:Airports of the British Commonwealth Air Training Plan

References

Notes

Citations

Bibliography

 Barris, Ted. Behind The Glory: The Plan that Won the Allied Air War. Markham, Ontario: Thomas Allen & Son Publishers, 2005. .
 Becker, Captain Dave. Yellow Wings: The Story of the Joint Air Training Scheme in World War 2. Pretoria: The SAAF Museum, 1989. .
 Brown, Russell. Desert Warriors: Australian P-40 Pilots at War in the Middle East and North Africa, 1941–1943. Maryborough Qld, Australia: Banner Books, 2000. .
 Bryce, Robert Broughton, edited by Matthew J. Bellamy. Canada and the Cost of World War II: The International Operations of Canada's Department of Finance 1939–1947. Montreal: McGill-Queen's University Press, 2005. .
 Collins, Robert. The Long and the Short and the Tall: An Ordinary Airman's War. Saskatoon: Western Producer Prairie Books, 1986. .
 Conrad, Peter C. Training for Victory: The British Commonwealth Air Training Plan in the West. Saskatoon: Western Producer Prairie Books, 1989. .
 Dunmore, Spencer. Wings For Victory. Toronto: McClelland and Stewart, 1994. .
 Greenhous, Brereton. "The Impact of the British Commonwealth Air Training Plan on Western Canada: Some Saskatchewan Case Studies." Journal of Canadian Studies/Revue d'études canadiennes, 16:3/4, Autumn/automne/Winter/hiver, 1981.
 Hallowell, Gerald, ed. The Oxford Companion to Canadian History. Oxford, UK: Oxford University Press, 2004. .
 Hatch, F.J. Aerodrome of Democracy: Canada and the British Commonwealth Air Training Plan 1939–1945. Ottawa: Canadian Department of National Defence, 1983. .
 Long, Gavin. The Six Years' War: A Concise History of Australia in the 1939–45 War. Canberra: Australian War Memorial, 1973. .
 McCarthy, John. A Last Call of Empire: Australian Aircrew, Britain and the Empire Air Training Scheme. Canberra: Australian War Memorial, 1988. .
 MacDonald, J.F. The War History of Southern Rhodesia 1939–1945. Bulawayo, Zimbabwe: Authority of the Government of Southern Rhodesia, 1947.
 Payne, Stephen, ed. Canadian Wings: A Remarkable Century of Flight. Vancouver: Douglas & McIntyre, 2006. .
 Smith. I. Norman The British Commonwealth Air Training Plan. Toronto: Macmillan Company of Canada Limited, 1941.

External links 

 "Thematic Study: WWII Aerodromes and associated structures in New South Wales
 Commonwealth Air Training Plan Museum 
 Veterans Affairs Canada – Commonwealth Air Training Plan
 Photographs of BCATP memorial, Middleton, Nova Scotia
 Photographs of BCATP memorial, Kingston, Nova Scotia
 BCATP School Listing and Photos
 "British Commonwealth Air Training Plan" in official history of RNZAF in WWII
The British Commonwealth Air Training Plan 1939–1945, An Historical Sketch and Record of Ceremony at RCAF Station Trenton
Newell, Alan. A Plan for the Future: The Legacies of the British Commonwealth Air Training Plan In Canada's Prairie Provinces. University of British Columbia. 2005

 
Military history of Australia during World War II
Military history of Canada during World War II
Military history of New Zealand during World War II
Military history of Rhodesia
Military history of Southern Rhodesia during World War II
Military history of South Africa during World War II
Aviation history of Canada
Royal Canadian Air Force
Events of National Historic Significance (Canada)
Canada–United Kingdom relations
Rhodesia–United Kingdom relations
South Africa–United Kingdom relations